Joensuu sub-region  is a subdivision of North Karelia and one of the Sub-regions of Finland since 2009.

Municipalities

 Heinävesi
 Ilomantsi
 Joensuu
 Juuka
 Kontiolahti
 Liperi
 Outokumpu
 Polvijärvi

Politics
Results of the 2018 Finnish presidential election:

 Sauli Niinistö   63.9%
 Pekka Haavisto   11.0%
 Paavo Väyrynen   6.9%
 Laura Huhtasaari   6.7%
 Matti Vanhanen   4.7%
 Tuula Haatainen   3.8%
 Merja Kyllönen   2.6%
 Nils Torvalds   0.4%

Sub-regions of Finland
Geography of North Karelia